Al-Aqiser is an archeological site in Ayn al-Tamr near Karbala in Iraq with what has been described as the Oldest eastern Christian Church.  Until recently it was used by Chaldeans of the Chaldean Catholic Church. The site is currently suffering neglect and erosion.

References

Churches in Iraq
Chaldean Catholic churches
Lakhmids